Waimea High School is a public high school in Waimea on the island of Kauai in the state of Hawaii.  It was established in 1881 and serves grades 9 through 12.  It is the westernmost high school in the United States of America.  The school mascot is the Menehune, and the school colors are blue and white.

The campus displays the mixed media sculpture Hoolilo by Ralph Kouchi and the stainless steel sculpture Waimea Ohana by Rowland Morita.

Waimea High School is the oldest high school on the island of Kauai.

Notable alumni from Waimea High School include former NFL player Jordon Dizon and Nā Hōkū Hanohano winning rapper Thomas Iannucci.

References

Public high schools in Kauai County, Hawaii
1881 establishments in Hawaii
Educational institutions established in 1881